Chidambaram Subramaniam (commonly known as CS) (30 January 1910 – 7 November 2000), was an Indian politician and independence activist. He served as Minister of Finance and Minister of Defence in the union cabinet. He later served as the Governor of Maharashtra. As the Minister for Food and Agriculture, he ushered the Indian Green Revolution, an era of self-sufficiency in food production along with M. S. Swaminathan, B. Sivaraman and Norman E. Borlaug. He was awarded Bharat Ratna, Indian's highest civilian award, in 1998, for his role in ushering Green Revolution.

Early life and education
Subramaniam was born in Senguttaipalayam a village near Pollachi in Coimbatore district, Tamil Nadu. Subramaniam completed his early education in Pollachi before moving to Chennai where he did his B.Sc in Physics at the Presidency College, Chennai (affiliated to the University of Madras). Later he graduated with degree in law from Madras Law college, Chennai (then affiliated to the same university). During his college days, he started Vanamalar Sangam and published a magazine called Pithan from Gobichettipalayam along with Periyasaamy Thooran, K. M. Ramasami Gounder, O. V. Alagesan and Justice Palanisami. His inspiration was his uncle Swami Chidbhavananda.

Political career

Early years
Subramaniam was an active member of the Civil disobedience movement against the British during his college days. He was imprisoned during the Quit India Movement in 1942. He was later elected to the Constituent Assembly and had a hand in the framing of the Constitution of India. He was a minister of Education, Law and Finance for Madras State from 1952 to 1962 under chief ministers Rajaji and K. Kamaraj. He was the First Leader of the House in the Madras Legislative Assembly for the entire duration. He was elected to the Lok Sabha in 1962 and was the Minister for Steel and Mines. Subsequently, he served as the Minister for Food and Agriculture. He also worked as the Deputy Chairman of the Planning Commission from 2 May 1971 to 22 July 1972.

Green Revolution
Along with M. S. Swaminathan and B. Sivaraman, Subramaniam was the architect of India's modern agricultural development policy, after the success of his programme which led to a record production of wheat in 1972 termed as the Indian Green Revolution. As Minister for Food and Agriculture, he introduced high-yielding varieties of seeds and more intensive application of fertilizers which paved the way for increased output of cereals and attainment of self-sufficiency in food-grains in the country. About his contribution, Dr. Norman E. Borlaug, writes:

He appointed M. S. Swaminathan, who played a major role in green revolution and Verghese Kurien as the chairman of National Dairy Development Board when he ushered the Indian White Revolution. Kurien says, that the key role played by Subramaniam in the whole thing (Operation Flood) is hardly mentioned. He founded the National Agro Foundation, Chennai and Bharathidasan Institute of Management, Tiruchirappalli.

Finance ministry and emergency
When the Indian National Congress split in 1969, he became the interim president of Congress (I) started by Indira Gandhi. Later, he was appointed Minister of Finance in the union cabinet by Indira Gandhi. He advised her to devalue Indian rupee and was the finance minister during the emergency in 1976.  After the emergency, he parted ways with Indira and joined the breakaway Congress faction led by Devraj Urs and Kasu Brahmananda Reddy.

Later years
He was appointed the union Minister of Defence by Charan Singh in 1979. He became the Governor of Maharashtra in 1990. He resigned after his criticism of the style of functioning of the then Indian Prime Minister P. V. Narasimha Rao.

Subramaniam died on 7 November 2000 at the age of 90 in Chennai. At his death, he was the last surviving cabinet minister who had served under Jawaharlal Nehru, as well as the last surviving cabinet minister from the Shastri and Nanda cabinets.

Awards
 Bharat Ratna, India's highest civilian honor, 1998
 Y. B. Chavan National Integration Award
 U Thant peace award, 1996
 Norman Borlaug award, 1996
 Anuvrat award, 1988

Publications
 The New Strategy in Indian Agriculture
 Some Countries which I visited Round The World
 The India of My Dreams

Legacy

A commemorative coin in his honour, was released by the Government of India in August 2010. A commemorative postage stamp was also released in his honour in 2010.

Shri Chidambaram Subramaniam Award - For Excellence in Character has been instituted by Bharatiya Vidya Bhavans which is awarded to its students annually.

References

External links

About us – National Agro Foundation
Genesis – Bharathidasan Institute of Management

Recipients of the Bharat Ratna
1910 births
2000 deaths
Indian National Congress politicians from Tamil Nadu
Governors of Maharashtra
Presidency College, Chennai alumni
University of Madras alumni
Tamil Nadu ministers
Members of the Constituent Assembly of India
Indian independence activists from Tamil Nadu
India MPs 1962–1967
Lok Sabha members from Tamil Nadu
India MPs 1971–1977
People from Coimbatore district
India MPs 1977–1979
People from Krishnagiri district
People from Dindigul district
Finance Ministers of India
Defence Ministers of India
Agriculture Ministers of India
Ministers_for_Corporate_Affairs
Commerce and Industry Ministers of India
Union Ministers from Tamil Nadu
Indian National Congress (U) politicians
Madras MLAs 1952–1957